Shawn Hochuli (born June 25, 1978) is a National Football League (NFL) official. He wears jersey #83. He entered the league in the 2014 NFL season and was promoted for 2018 from back judge to referee, following the retirement of his father, longtime referee Ed Hochuli, and another veteran official, Jeff Triplette.

The promotion of Shawn Hochuli to referee has been widely criticized by those around the league as a direct example of nepotism in the modern era of the NFL as Shawn had far less experience than many other senior officials. Outside of officiating, Hochuli is a wealth management advisor.

Hochuli played college football at Pitzer College. He worked his first NFL season in 2014 as a side judge.  He has also worked as an official in the Pac-12 Conference,  Arena Football League, and arenafootball2 games. On August 13, 2011, he was head referee for ArenaBowl XXIV between the Jacksonville Sharks and Arizona Rattlers. He also worked as head referee for a 2017 pre-season game. During the 2022 NFC playoff game between the Tampa Bay Buccaneers and the Los Angeles Rams, he gave Tom Brady the first unsportsmanlike conduct penalty of Brady's career.

2022 crew 

 R: Shawn Hochuli
 U: Terry Killens
 DJ: Patrick Holt
 LJ: Greg Bradley
 FJ: Anthony Flemming
 SJ: Chad Hill
 BJ: Rich Martinez
 RO: Tyler Cerimeli
 RA: Mark Bitar

References

1978 births
Living people
National Football League officials
Pitzer College alumni